Chopped and screwed (also called screwed and chopped or slowed and throwed) is a music genre and technique of remixing music that involves slowing down the tempo and deejaying. It developed in the Houston hip hop scene in the early 1990s by DJ Screw. The screwed technique involves slowing the tempo of a song down to 60 and 70 quarter-note beats per minute and applying techniques such as skipping beats, record scratching, stop-time and affecting portions of the original composition to create a "chopped-up" version of the song.

History

1990: Creation 
Preceding the late 1990s, most Southern hip hop was upbeat and fast, like Miami bass and Memphis, which was inspired by Afrika Bambaataa & the Soulsonic Force with their groundbreaking track "Planet Rock". Unlike its southern musical counterparts Houston's rap style has consistently remained slower, even in the beginning of Houston hip hop, as can be heard on the earliest Houston based group Geto Boys records from the mid to late 80's.

It is unknown when DJ Screw definitively created "screwed and chopped" music. Screw's former manager Charles Washington stated, "Screw mistakenly created the sound while hanging out with friends at an apartment in the late 80s." Screw discovered that dramatically reducing the pitch of a record gave a mellow, heavy sound that emphasized lyrics to the point of storytelling. Initially, the slow-paced hip hop genre was referred to as laid-back driving music and was limited to South Houston until it was popularized by DJs such as DJ T-Rent Dinero and DJ Z-Rusty.

1991–2000: Rise to popularity and death of DJ Screw 

In Houston, between 1991 and 1992, there was a notable increase in the use of lean (also known as purple drank and sizzurp) which many believe contributed to the allure of screw music. The drug beverage has been considered a major influence on the making and listening of chopped and screwed music due to its perceived effect of slowing the brain down, and giving the slow, mellow music its appeal. In an interview for the documentary film Soldiers United For Cash, DJ Screw denounced the claim that one has to use lean to enjoy screwed and chopped music, saying, "People think just to listen to my tapes you gotta be high or dranked out. That ain't true. There's kids getting my tapes, moms and dads getting my tapes, don't smoke or drink or nothing."

In the mid-1990s, chopped and screwed music started to move to the north side of Houston by way of DJ Michael "5000" Watts, and later OG Ron C. A rivalry between north and south Houston over the true originators of chopped and screwed began to arise. Michael "5000" Watts always gave credit to DJ Screw as the originator of chopped and screwed music, although Watts has been a proponent of the slogan "screwed and chopped" instead of "chopped and screwed". In the late 1990s, with the help of P2P networks such as Napster, chopped and screwed music spread to a much wider audience.

On November 16, 2000, DJ Screw was found dead in the bathroom of his music studio. The autopsy report later revealed that Screw died from a combination of codeine, marijuana and alcohol.

2000–present: Expansion and development 
Following the death of DJ Screw, his musical influence spread all over the southern United States. Later in 2000, the Memphis-based group Three 6 Mafia came out with their song "Sippin' on Some Syrup". The song debuted as a minor hit but later became one of Three 6 Mafia's most popular songs.

The 2007 documentary film Screwed in Houston details the history of the Houston rap scene and the influence of the chopped and screwed subculture on Houston hip hop. In 2011, University of Houston Libraries acquired over 1,000 albums owned by DJ Screw. Some of the albums were part of an exhibit in early 2012 and, along with the rest, went available for research in 2013.

As of to date, the chopped and screwed music genre has been added to all forms of streaming services including iTunes, Spotify and has crossed over to receive mass mainstream appeal.

The Chopstars/ChopNotSlop 
Created by Swishahouse Records Co-founder OG Ron C they began calling their remixes ChopNotSlop due to all the “sloppy” remixes that came out after the passing of DJ Screw. Since 2001 they have dedicated their cause to the legacy of DJ Screw. The Chopstars have become the prominent source for chopped up music. With official releases with Brent Faiyaz, Don Toliver and Little Dragon (Nabuma Purple Rubberband) they have made a niche in the sub genre. They currently have a radio show called ChopNotSlopShow on Sound 42 which is Drake’s radio station on SiriusXM. Notable members include DJ Ryan Wolf, official DJ of the Cleveland Browns, DJ Candlestick, DJ Hollygrove, Mike G formerly of Odd Future and Oscar Award winning director Barry Jenkins as a creative collaborator.

Future screw and lean house 
In the mid-2010s, producers on SoundCloud began experimenting with fusing chopped and screwed music and EDM. It has since developed into subgenres such as "future screw and lean house".

Slowed and reverb 
"Slowed and reverb" (stylized as "slowed + reverb") is a technique of remixing which involves slowing down and adding reverb to a previously existing song, often created by using digital audio editors such as Audacity. The technique originated in 2017, when Houston-based producer Jarylun Moore (known online as Slater), having been inspired by DJ Screw, began uploading remixes of popular songs using the technique to YouTube. The first of these  a remix of Lil Uzi Vert's song "20 Min"  earned over one million views on the platform in under two months, eventually earning over four million views before being taken down. Other notable producers in this sub-genre include wretchshop (also known as ciki 8k), rum world, Aestheticg, imlonely, Chovies as well as streliz. The style became especially popular on YouTube, where it became common to play remixes over looping clips from retrofuturistic anime scenes. Slowed and reverb remixes were also uploaded to Spotify using the service's podcast feature. For Okayplayer, Elijah C. Watson dubbed slowed and reverb remixes "the soundtrack for Generation Z", comparing the style to lo-fi hip hop.

Remixes using the technique also became popular on the video-sharing service TikTok. However, they became controversial on social media in mid-2020 after a viral video posted to TikTok failed to attribute the creation of slowed and reverb to chopped and screwed, causing users to brand slowed and reverb a "gentrified" version of chopped and screwed. For the Houston Chronicle, Shelby Stewart wrote, "Give DJ Screw his flowers. Slowed + reverb is a poor imitation of what chopped and screwed music is."

See also 
Nightcore

References 

20th-century music genres
21st-century music genres
1990s in music
2000s in music
2010s in music
Hip hop genres
Southern hip hop
DJing
Unofficial adaptations